Glanworth is a village on the R512 regional road in County Cork, Ireland. As of 2016, Glanworth's population was 603.

Glanworth has a Roman Catholic church, a school, one shop and four pubs. The village is locally known as 'The Harbour', this is believed to stem from the Latin word, arbor, meaning tree. Glanworth is within the Cork East Dáil constituency.

Built heritage

Labbacallee megalithic tomb

Glanworth Castle

The 13th-century Glanworth Castle was built beside the River Funshion by the Condon family, Norman settlers who arrived in the Cork area in the twelfth century. The keep and the castle wall remain. The castle is now used mainly as a public walk.

Glanworth Abbey
Glanworth Abbey was also built in the 13th century, next to the castle, by the Dominican order. The priory was desecrated in the 16th century. The priory's gable tracery window, now restored, was once part of the Protestant church, which is located in the Catholic graveyard.

Glanworth Bridge
Built in the mid-17th century, Glanworth Bridge is a narrow 13-arch bridge, and one of the oldest remaining examples in the region. According to The Corkman, it is said to be the "narrowest and oldest public bridge in everyday use" in Europe.

Glanworth Mill 
Glanworth mill, built in the mid-19th century, is located along the banks of the River Funcheon and sits below the Norman castle. Built during the 1840 as part of a famine relief scheme, it is the site of the last remaining reverse undershot water wheel in Ireland.

Transport
Glanworth railway station opened on 23 March 1891, closed for passenger and goods traffic on 27 January 1947 and finally closed altogether on 1 December 1953.

Because of its historical status as a town, it is at the convergence point of a number of minor roads.

Sport
The town has men's and women's Gaelic Athletic Association teams with a tradition in Gaelic football. In November 2009, Glanworth GAA's intermediate football team won the Cork Junior A Football Championship for the third time in their history, defeating Ballygarvan.

Glanworth is also home to the 105th Scout Group (Scouting Ireland), and two association football (soccer) teams: Glanworth United and Glanworth Celtic.

Film
Several scenes from the 1999 Bob Hoskins film Felicia's Journey were shot on location in Glanworth.

See also
 List of towns and villages in Ireland
 List of abbeys and priories in Ireland (County Cork)
 Fermoy Barony

References

Towns and villages in County Cork
Civil parishes of County Cork